Marechal Deodoro is Marshal Deodoro da Fonseca (1827–1892), the first President of Brazil.

Marechal Deodoro may also refer to:

 Marechal Deodoro, Alagoas, a town in Brazil named after Deodoro da Fonseca
 Marechal Deodoro (São Paulo Metro), a train station

See also 
 Deodoro (disambiguation)